The 2015 Men's League1 Ontario season was the second season of play for League1 Ontario, a Division 3 semi-professional soccer league in the Canadian soccer pyramid and the highest level of soccer based in the Canadian province of Ontario.

This season saw the return of all nine teams which completed the previous season, as well as the addition of three new teams for the Men's Division. The 2015 season also marked the birth of League1 Ontario's Women's Division, which began play with seven teams.

Changes from 2014
Three new teams (Oakville Blue Devils, ProStars FC, and Sanjaxx Lions) joined the Men's Division for this season, resulting in a twelve-team competition for that side.  As a result, the group stage of the Men's cup will change from two five-team groups to four three-team groups.

The Cataraqui Clippers changed their name to the Kingston Clippers starting in this season.

Teams

Source:

Standings
Each team will play 22 matches as part of the season; one home and one away against every other team in the league.  There are no playoffs at the end of the season; the first-place team will be crowned as league champion and will face the PLSQ league champion in the Inter-Provincial Cup.

Cup

The cup tournament is a separate contest from the rest of the season, in which all twelve teams from the men's division take part.  It is not a form of playoffs at the end of the season (as is typically seen in North American sports), but is more like the Canadian Championship or the FA Cup, albeit only for League1 Ontario teams. All matches are separate from the regular season, and are not reflected in the season standings.

The cup tournament for the men's division consists of two phases. The first phase is a group phase, where four groups of three teams play in a single round-robin format. From each group, the top two teams advance to the knockout phase, which consists of a quarterfinal, semifinal, and final.

Each match in the group stage must return a result; any match drawn after 90 minutes will advance directly to kicks from the penalty mark, with the winner receiving two points in the standings, while the loser receives one point.  Likewise, any knockout round matches which are tied after full time head directly to penalty kicks instead of extra time.

Group stage 
Group A

Group B

Group C

Group D

Knockout stage 

Quarterfinals

Semifinals

Final

Inter-Provincial Cup Championship 
The Inter-Provincial Cup Championship was a two-legged home-and-away series between the league champions of League1 Ontario and the Première Ligue de soccer du Québec – the only Division 3 men's semi-professional soccer leagues based fully within Canada.

Oakville Blue Devils won 5–3 on aggregate

Top goalscorers
This table includes goals scored in all competitions, including both league and cup matches.

Awards 

The following players were named League All-Stars.

References

External links

League1
League1 Ontario seasons